Jorge Guinle (Rio de Janeiro, 1916 – 2004) was a billionaire from the Guinle family of Rio, Brazil. 

He was known as one of the richest men on earth, a jazz enthusiast and the "last tycoon playboy". 

He was romantically associated with numerous stars including Marilyn Monroe, Anita Ekberg, Romy Schneider, Hedy Lamarr, Ava Gardner, Rita Hayworth, Jayne Mansfield, Susan Hayward, Carole Landis, and Linda Christian.

References

2004 deaths
Brazilian billionaires
1916 births